The year 1704 in music involved some significant events.

Events
Johann Christoph Pepusch arrives in London.
Following her husband's death, Elisabeth-Claude Jacquet de la Guerre begins hosting concerts in her home.
Antonio Vivaldi becomes general superintendent of music at the Ospedale della Pietà, Venice.
Johann Jacob Bach becomes an oboist in the army of King Charles XII of Sweden, inspiring Johann Sebastian to write a Capriccio on the Absence of His Most Beloved Brother.
During a performance of Johann Mattheson's opera, Cleopatra, the composer almost kills his friend, Georg Frideric Handel, in a violent quarrel.

Classical music 
Henricus Albicastro – [12] Concerti, Op.7
Attilo Ariosti – La madre dei Maccabei
Johann Sebastian Bach 
Nach dir, Herr, verlanget mich, BWV 150 (or 1707)
Toccata and Fugue D Minor BWV 565 (poss.)
Ach Herr, mich armen Sünder, BWV 742
Sonata in D major, BWV 963
Capriccio in B-flat major, BWV 992
 Antonio Caldara – Il trionfo dell'innocenza (Second edition)
Louis-Nicolas Clérambault – Livre de pièces de clavecin
François Couperin – 7 Versets du motet composé de l'ordre du roy, 1704
William Croft – 6 Sonatas of Two Parts
Michel Richard Delalande – Dominus regnavit, S.65
George Frideric Handel – Oboe Concerto in G minor, HWV 287

Reinhard Keiser – Der blutige und sterbende Jesus (by Christian Friedrich Hunold)
Michele Mascitti – [12] Sonate, Op.1
Jean-Baptiste Morin – Motets à une et deux voix, Livre I
James Paisible – Musick perform'd before Her Majesty and the new King of Spain
Alessandro Scarlatti 
Perdono, Amor, perdono, H.554
S. Casimiro, re di Pononia
Johann Schenck – 2 Sonatas for 2 Viols
Giovanni Battista Tibaldi – 12 Trio Sonatas, Op.2

Opera
Attilo Ariosti – I gloriosi presagi di Scipione Africano
Giovanni Bononcini  
Il fiore delle eroine
Il ritorno di Giulio Cesare
 Francesco Bartolomeo Conti – Alba Cornelia
Johann Mattheson – Die unglückselige Cleopatra
Carlo Francesco Pollarolo – Irene (revised by Domenico Scarlatti for performance at Naples).

Births 

May 7 – Carl Heinrich Graun, composer and singer (died 1759)
June 11 – Carlos Seixas, composer (died 1742)
October 2 – František Tůma, organist and composer (died 1774)
December 31 – Carl Gotthelf Gerlach, organist (died 1761)
probable – Claude Parisot, organ builder (died 1784)

Deaths 
February 7 – Lady Mary Dering, composer (born 1629)
February 23 – Georg Muffat, composer (born 1653)
February 24 – Marc-Antoine Charpentier, composer (born 1643)
February 25 – Isabella Leonarda, composer of church music (born 1620)
April – Georg Christoph Strattner, friend and colleague of Bach at Lüneburg (born c. 1644)
May 3 – Heinrich Ignaz Biber, violinist and composer (born 1644)
September 6 – Francesco Provenzale, composer (born 1624)
November 2 – Johann Jakob Walther, violinist and composer (born 1650)
November 16 – Chikka Devaraja, ruler of Mysore, composer and music theorist (born 1673)
December 14 
Selim I Giray, Crimean khan, also known as a poet and musician (born 1631)
Joseph-François Duché de Vancy, librettist (born 1668)

References

 
18th century in music
Music by year